Avilly-Saint-Léonard is a commune in the Oise department in northern France.

Population

See also
 Communes of the Oise department

References

External links

 Official site

Communes of Oise